The inaugural U. S. Open Cycling Championships is a road bicycle racing event that was held April 7, 2007 and ran from Williamsburg to Richmond, Virginia. The race was broadcast nationally in the United States on NBC Sports from 2:30 to 5:00 p.m. Eastern Time.

The U.S. Open, developed in partnership with USA Cycling and sanctioned by the UCI with the men's event part of the 2006–07 UCI America Tour. The U.S. Cycling Open featured both men's and women's professional fields.  According to published reports, the event attempts to showcase the historic attractions of Virginia just weeks before the 400th Anniversary of America's first permanent English settlement in Jamestown, Virginia.

Winners

Men's Event

Women's Event

External links
 Official website

References 

Cycling, U.S. Open Championships
2007 establishments in the United States
U.S. Open Cycling Championships
Cycle races in the United States
U.S. Open
U.S. Open Cycling Championships
U.S. Open Cycling Championships
UCI America Tour races
April 2007 sports events in the United States